Gregg and Greg are surnames of English or Scottish origin. In England, they are variant forms of the surname Gregory. The surnames are first recorded as Gregge in 1234, within the Liber feodorum, a document compiled in the reign of Henry II of England. Another early instance of the name is Gregge, recorded in 1306, within the Feet of Fines (for Essex); and as Greggez in 1504, within the Register of the Freemen of the City of York.

Gregg is also a Scottish surname, a shorthand variant of the Highland Clan Gregor or MacGregor.

People with the surname Gregg
 Alan Gregg (physician) (1890–1957), American physician and Rockefeller Foundation officer
 Alan Gregg (musician), New Zealand musician
 Alexander W. Gregg (1855–1919), U.S Representative from Texas
 Allan Gregg (born 1952), Canadian political advisor and pundit
 Andrew Gregg (1755–1835), U.S. Representative and Senator from Pennsylvania
 Avani Gregg (born 2002), American internet celebrity, actor, and make-up artist
 Clark Gregg (born 1962), film and television actor and writer
 David Gregg (disambiguation), multiple people
 Donald Gregg (born 1927), U.S. Ambassador to South Korea (1989–1993)
 Eric Gregg (1951–2006), Major League Baseball umpire (1975–1999)
 Forrest Gregg (1933–2019), American football player and coach
 Harry Gregg (1932–2020), professional football player who played for Northern Ireland and Manchester United, and is a survivor of the Munich air disaster.
 Hugh Gregg (1917–2003), governor from New Hampshire
 James M. Gregg (1806–1869), U.S. Representative from Indiana
 John Gregg (1828–1864), American Civil War Confederate general
 John Irvin Gregg (1826–1892), American Civil War Union commander, cousin of David Gregg
 John Robert Gregg (1867–1948), the creator of the eponymous shorthand system Gregg Shorthand
 Judd Gregg (born 1947), governor and U.S. Senator from New Hampshire
 Julie Gregg (1937–2016), American actress
 Maxcy Gregg (1814–1862), American Civil War Confederate general
 Milton Fowler Gregg (1892–1978), Canadian First World War Victoria Cross recipient and Member of Canadian Parliamenter
 Paul Gregg (born 1941), English multi-millionaire businessman
 Randy Gregg (ice hockey) (born 1956), former Canadian ice hockey player
 Randy Gregg (musician) (born 1969), American hard rock musician
 Richard Bartlett Gregg (1885–1974), American philosopher, pacifist, and friend of Mahatma Gandhi
 Tommy Gregg (born 1963), Major League Baseball player
 Troy Leon Gregg (1948–1980), convicted murderer, first death sentence to be upheld by Supreme Court after Furman v. Georgia and first inmate to successfully escape Georgia's death row
 Gregg v. Georgia
 William Gregg (industrialist) (1800–1867), Founder of the pioneer Graniteville, South Carolina textile mill
 William Gregg (soldier) (1890–1962), British First World War Victoria Cross recipient
 Harriet Gregg Young (1818 - 1909), President Harry S. Truman's maternal grandmother

People with the surname Greg
Percy Greg (1836–1889), English writer, son of William Rathbone Greg
Robert Hyde Greg (1795–1875), English industrialist and economist
Samuel Greg (1758–1834), English entrepreneur
Samuel Greg (junior) (1804–1876), English industrialist and philanthropist, son of Samuel Greg
W. W. Greg (1875–1959), English bibliographer and Shakespeare scholar
Robert Greg (1876–1953), British diplomat
William Rathbone Greg (1809–1881), English essayist

References

Surnames of English origin
Surnames of Scottish origin
English-language surnames
Surnames from given names